Mungo's Hi Fi is a sound system based in Glasgow, Scotland, which follows the original Jamaican sound system tradition. After working together previously, Tom Tattersall and Doug Paine founded the group in 2000, writing, recording, producing and performing their own brand of reggae and dub music, working in collaboration with other artists and producers. They were joined in 2002 by Craig Macleod, and in 2006 by Jerome Joly.

Mungo's Hi Fi have released 10 albums alongside a number of EPs and singles, collaborating with a variety of artists including Mike "Prince Fatty" Pelanconi, Max Romeo, Charlie P and Daddy Freddy.

Discography

Albums

Singles and EPs

References

External links
Mungo's Hi Fi
Mungo's Hi Fi on Facebook
Scotch Bonnet Records
Scotch Bonnet Soundcloud
Mungo's Hi Fi on YouTube

British reggae musical groups
Dub musical groups
Sound systems
Musical groups from Glasgow